The Nassau Inter-County Express (NICE) is the local bus system serving Nassau County, New York. It also serves parts of western Suffolk County, New York as well as eastern portions of the New York City borough of Queens. It was formerly operated under the name of MTA Long Island Bus, the trading name of the Metropolitan Suburban Bus Authority, a division of MTA Regional Bus Operations. In 2011, the owner, Nassau County, decided to outsource the system to a private operator, Veolia Transport, due to a funding dispute with the MTA.

History

Private companies (pre-1973)

The MTA began operating Nassau County bus service in 1973 under the name  Metropolitan Suburban Bus Authority, through the merging of 11 private operators (routes in italics have been discontinued):

Bee-Line (N1, N4, N6, N2*, N3) and subsidiaries:
Rockville Centre Bus (N15, N16, N14, N17*)
Utility Lines (N19; extended to Patchogue along current S40 Suffolk Transit route)
Stage Coach Lines (N71, N73, N74, and earlier N70): Note: The N70 under Stage Coach was a loop route from Hempstead to Levittown, Bellmore, Wantagh, and back to Hempstead.
Mid-Island Transit (N78, N79, N80, N81): This operator was acquired by Stage Coach, which would be acquired by Bee-Line. Also operated by this operator was a route from today's Broadway Mall to Oyster Bay.
Schenck Transportation (N20, N21, N22, N23, N24, N25, N26, N27, N45, N51) and previously acquired:
Nassau Bus Line (N31, N32, N33)
Universal Auto Bus (N57 and N58)
Jerusalem Avenue Bus Line (N54, N55, N53)
Hempstead Bus Corporation (N35, N36, N37 [merged into N35], N40, N41,  N47, N48, N49)
Roosevelt Bus Line (N62)
Branch Bus Corporation (N69; transferred to Long Beach in 1984)
Hendrickson Bus Corporation (N67, discontinued January 1975)

(*) denotes original bus routes that are now community shuttle routes

MTA Long Island Bus

In the 1980s, the N28, N46, N50 (all discontinued) and N70 (as an N72 branch) were instituted as new routes, with the N20 extended to Hicksville. The 1990s saw the creation of a shuttle around Roosevelt Field (N93, now discontinued), two shuttles designed to take customers from train stations to work sites (the N94 and N95, both discontinued), and a service connecting Nassau County to JFK Airport (the N91, now discontinued), with the 2000s seeing a Merrick shuttle (now discontinued) and the N8 (now discontinued) and N43 routes being created.

In 2007, Long Island Bus averaged over 109,000 weekday riders, many of which include customers connecting to other MTA services in the region. By 2011, the MTA had averaged 101,981 weekday riders by the time of the agency's exit from operating the service.

Privatization and NICE

In 2010, the future of MTA Long Island Bus became uncertain, as the MTA threatened drastic cuts due to Nassau County's disproportionately small contributions to the operation. Since 2000, the MTA has provided a unique subsidy (of $24 million in 2011 and over $140 million since 2000) to the Nassau County bus system that the other New York City suburban county bus systems have not received. The county's contribution was $9.1 million per year out of a total budget of $133.1 million, and the MTA desired that this contribution increase to $26 million. Critics have noted that Westchester County subsidized its similarly sized Bee-Line Bus System service by $33 million/year, and that Suffolk subsidizes its substantially smaller Suffolk County Transit system by $24 million/year. The county hoped to reduce its contribution from $9.1 million to $4.1 million by using a private contractor; the planned county contribution was later decreased to $2.5 million/year.

By March 2011, the MTA—citing Nassau's refusal to pay its contracted amount—proposed a set of major service reductions which would have eliminated over half of the routes, with the greatest impact on southeastern Nassau County, eliminating all routes operating south of Hempstead Turnpike and east of the Meadowbrook State Parkway (except for the N71). After reviewing the service cut plans, County Executive Ed Mangano considered severing ties with the MTA and privatizing the Long Island Bus system. A temporary reprieve, via additional state funding, would have sustained service through the end of 2011. However, on April 27, 2011, the MTA voted to cease all bus service in Nassau County after the end of 2011. Mangano then announced that he had retained Veolia Transport to operate the system beginning in 2012 through a public-private partnership pending legislative approval. On November 10, 2011, Veolia and Mangano announced that the service was going to be renamed Nassau Inter-County Express (or NICE), upon Veolia's takeover of the system. All buses, including Able-Ride vehicles, would be painted into a new paint scheme to reflect the change. On December 12, 2011, the legislature unanimously approved the Veolia contract, which was subsequently approved by the state-controlled Nassau County Interim Finance Authority (NIFA) on December 22, 2011. Veolia began operations January 1, 2012.  This Veolia plan was the subject of heated county public hearings in which Long Island Bus riders and employees criticized the plan.

In February 2012, Veolia announced service cuts and adjustments to take effect in April 2012. While there were no route cancellations planned, just over $7 million in cuts to existing routes were planned, with service reductions and route concentrations planned for routes primarily serving northern and eastern Nassau County, beginning in spring 2012, with resources redirected towards busier routes. These cuts ultimately included decreased service on 30 routes, including elimination of weekend service and decreased midday service on seven routes. These cuts were criticized as occurring too soon, only six weeks after starting service. The Long Island Bus Rider's Union, a transit advocacy group, sharply criticized the cuts, claiming that "the announcements of service adjustments on the [NICE bus] website were very unclear", that service to many health care and social service centers was cut, and that "many of the NICE bus service cuts appear to be in low income communities where more people rely on buses to get to work and to access the few available health care centers that serve their needs."

In 2013, the NICE bus system obtained a "windfall" from increased New York State (but not Nassau County) aid of $5 million and $3 million from a fare increase for MetroCard bus riders.

In March 2014, the NICE bus system faced another $3.3 million budget deficit. At that time, the bus system expected "an increase of state aid — its largest revenue stream — of $1.2 million."

On October 31, 2014, the Nassau County Legislature adopted a 2015 budget that will increase Nassau County's contribution to NICE bus from $2.6 million to $4.6 million in 2015 and promised not to raise fares outside of MetroCard fare increases (MetroCard is controlled by the Metropolitan Transportation Authority). This new $4.6 million contribution was hailed as a victory for Nassau County bus riders, although it will still leave NICE bus with a $6 million operating deficit. However, on December 11, 2014, Nassau County executive Ed Mangano proposed cutting $4 million from Nassau County's NICE bus contribution (in addition to cuts to numerous other Nassau County services) to replace the $30 million that will be lost after the shutdown of Nassau County's controversial school speed zone cameras.

On January 17, 2016, NICE eliminated fifteen routes due to a budget deficit and low ridership and restructured three other routes.

On June 27, 2016, NICE restored service on two routes (N80/81) and restored two others (N14, N17) as shuttles.

On September 6, 2016, NICE restored service on one route (N51) and restored three others (original N2, N62, N73) as shuttles.

In December 2016, NICE announced a $12 million budget shortfall for FY2017 and warned of additional service cuts. These cuts were proposed to the Transit Advisory Committee, but failed to pass. A more severe set of cuts was passed in February, eliminating ten routes and reducing four more. Many of these routes were the ones restored in 2016. Additional last minute state funding allowed service on three routes to be saved.

In July 2018, a multi-year plan to restructure and improve service on the system was released for public comment. Improvements include a more developed frequency network, restoration of former services, and express buses to Manhattan.

Fare

The current fare is $2.75 ($1.35 for seniors and disabled customers) with a MetroCard (including unlimited cards) or coins. Students with ID receive a discount of $0.25 from the base fare. Dollar bills are not accepted on any NICE fixed-route buses. Transfers are available upon request with coins, and are included automatically with MetroCard. The transfers are valid for two hours and can be used on two connecting NICE bus routes; no round-trips nor stopovers. They are also valid on Suffolk County Transit, Long Beach Bus, Huntington Area Rapid Transit (HART) or MTA New York City Transit, with the following restrictions:
Transfers to non-MetroCard buses are with coins only.
Transfers to the New York City Subway, or New York City Bus or MTA Bus express service, are available with MetroCard only (express buses require additional fare).
Transfers from Suffolk Transit, Huntington Area Rapid Transit (HART) or Long Beach Bus require payment of a $0.25 fare.
The Able-Ride paratransit fare is $3.75, payable in Able-Ride tickets or exact fare.

Bus depots

Nassau Inter-County Express has two operating depots, one each for its fixed route and paratransit operations, as well as an additional depot that was closed in 2017.

Current

Mitchel Field Depot (CNG)
The Mitchel Field Depot (marked Senator Norman J. Levy Transit Facility on older buses and on the building itself) is located at 700 Commercial Avenue in Uniondale, and is the headquarters and central garage for Nassau Inter-County Express fixed route service. The garage is named after the Mitchel Air Force Base that operated there from 1918 until 1961. All routes are dispatched from this garage. It handles both 60 ft articulated buses and 40 ft buses.

Stewart Avenue Depot (Able-Ride)
The Stewart Avenue Depot is located at 947 Stewart Avenue in East Garden City. All Able-Ride Nassau County shared-ride ADA paratransit service is dispatched from this garage.

Former

Rockville Centre Depot (CNG)
The Rockville Centre Bus Depot is located at 50 Banks Avenue in Rockville Centre. This garage was originally the home of Bee Line, Inc, and was closed in 2017 as part of a cost-cutting move. It is currently used as a storage garage for retired NICE buses; the future of this depot is unknown at this time.

Fleet
All fixed-route NICE buses are ADA compliant, CNG-fueled, and semi low-floor. All buses are also equipped with "smart bus" technology from Woodbury-based Clever Devices, which includes automated onboard route and stop announcements. However, Nassau Inter-County Express has recently hired Clever Devices again to replace its original "smart bus" system in most of the fleet with new on-board units and software that use GPS data to calculate the next stop announcements instead of odometer-based data with the older system. The new system will also provide maintenance with vehicle diagnostics data and provide customers and dispatchers alike with real-time bus location data accessible online (akin to MTA Bus Time).

Active bus fleet

Fixed-route fleet

Paratransit fleet
All NICE Paratransit buses use diesel fuel.

Future bus fleet
NICE Bus awarded New Flyer bus industries with a contract to build six 40-foot battery-electric XE40 buses.

Additionally, an option order for Gillig Advantage BRT Plus buses are expected to be exercised to replace all 2012 Orion VII EPA10 buses.

Routes

NICE runs fixed-route service on 37 routes, plus two shuttles, servicing the towns of Hempstead, North Hempstead, and the southern part of Oyster Bay, along with parts of the cities of Long Beach and Glen Cove. Non-shuttle routes are designated "n" for Nassau County, with service provided daily (although not all routes operate 7 days a week), and 24-hour service provided on the n40/41 Mineola - Freeport, n4 Merrick Road and n6 Hempstead Turnpike routes.

NICE routes operating to Jamaica and Flushing, Queens operate closed-door service in Queens (that is, local service is not provided solely for travel within Queens; appropriate MTA bus services must be used instead).  There are two exceptions to this: the n24, where one side of Jericho Turnpike/Jamaica Avenue is in New York City, but the other side of the street is in the Town of Hempstead (eastbound drop-off begins at 225th Street, where state maintenance of Jamaica Avenue begins, and westbound pickups occur as far west as 239th Street); and the n31/n32 and n33, which operate open-door in a portion of Far Rockaway where no other bus service is available. In addition, the n33 operates closed-door within the City of Long Beach, where local service is provided by Long Beach Bus.

See also
 Suffolk County Transit - the bus system in Suffolk County, to the immediate east.
 MTA New York City Bus - the bus system in New York City, to the immediate west.
 Long Beach Bus - the bus system in the City of Long Beach in Nassau County.
 Huntington Area Rapid Transit - the bus system in the Town of Huntington in Suffolk County.

References

External links

Nassau Inter-County Express

Bus transportation in New York (state)
Surface transportation in Greater New York
Transdev
Transit authorities with natural gas buses
Transportation on Long Island
2012 establishments in New York (state)